Raj Kumar is an Indian para-badminton player from Punjab. He had been ranked world number one in para-badminton men's doubles SU5 in 2019.

Achievements

World Championships 
Men's singles

Men's doubles

Mixed doubles

Asian Para Games 
Men's doubles

Mixed doubles

BWF Para Badminton World Circuit (2 titles, 2 runners-up) 
The BWF Para Badminton World Circuit – Grade 2, Level 1, 2 and 3 tournaments has been sanctioned by the Badminton World Federation from 2022.

Men's doubles

Mixed doubles

International Tournaments (5 titles, 4 runners-up) 
Men's singles

Men's doubles

Mixed doubles

Awards 
 Arjuna Award (2016)

References

Living people
1986 births
Paralympic athletes of India
Disabled
Sports
Indian male para-badminton players
Recipients of the Arjuna Award